Kilburn is a ward in the London Borough of Camden, in the United Kingdom. The ward has existed since the creation of the borough on 1 April 1965 and was first used in the 1964 elections. The ward was redrawn in May 1978 and May 2002. The ward underwent minor boundary changes for the 2022 election. In 2018, the ward had an electorate of 8,548. The Boundary Commission projects the electorate to rise to 9,111 in 2025.

Councillors

Election results
Like all other wards of Camden, Kilburn is represented by three councillors on Camden London Borough Council.  The last election was held on 22 May 2014, when all three councillors were elected.  All three currently represent the Labour Party.

*denotes an incumbent

*denotes an incumbent

References

Wards of the London Borough of Camden
1965 establishments in England